Sabrina Marie Le Beauf (born March 21, 1958) is an American actress best known for her portrayal of Sondra Huxtable on the NBC situation comedy The Cosby Show. She has voiced the character Norma Bindlebeep on the Nick at Nite animated series Fatherhood, a show based on Bill Cosby's book of the same name.

Early life
Sabrina was born on March 21, 1958, in New Orleans, Louisiana. Eager to leave the strictly segregated lifestyle of 1950s Louisiana behind, her family moved to Los Angeles, California soon after her birth. Her parents divorced, and Sabrina lived with her maternal grandmother, Sce Ethel Holmes, in south central LA until her mother's remarriage. When Sabrina was 10 years old, she returned to live with her mother and stepfather in Inglewood, California. Acting interested her from a young age, and she performed in many school plays, starring as Cinderella in elementary school. Sabrina also took on leadership roles, including high school class president at St. Matthias Catholic Girls High School and a Girls' State delegate.

After high school Sabrina attended UCLA, earning her undergraduate degree in theater. During her time at UCLA she became frustrated by the lack of parts offered to African American students, and in response formed a black students' theater group to allow them to put on their own shows.  In September 1980, she began graduate work at the Yale School of Drama, where she earned her master's degree in acting.

Career
In 1984, Le Beauf auditioned for the role of the eldest Huxtable daughter Sondra on The Cosby Show. 26 years old at the time of her audition, she was initially considered too old to play one of the children, being only 10 years younger than Phylicia Rashad, the actress who played her mother, Clair Huxtable. Pop singer Whitney Houston also auditioned for the same part, but refused to sign the contract as she also wanted to become a singer. Her refusal to sign the contract which would bind her to the show and put a singing career on the back burner forced the producers to give the role to Le Beauf. Sabrina went on to play Sondra Huxtable for all eight seasons of The Cosby Show, from 1984 through the series' end in 1992. Sondra, a Princeton graduate that went on to marry and start a family of her own, was a popular character on the show; in 1988, 50 million viewers tuned in to watch Sondra give birth to twins, named Winnie and Nelson in honor of Nelson and Winnie Mandela.

During her time on The Cosby Show, Le Beauf also appeared in the series Hotel and the TV movie Howard Beach: Making a Case for Murder. She also had brief appearances as bridge officer Ensign Giusti on two episodes of Star Trek: The Next Generation and on the comedy The Sinbad Show. Le Beauf also continued her work in the theater, starring as Rosalind in a production of Shakespeare's As You Like It.

Currently, Le Beauf is a frequent leading lady performing with the Shakespeare Theatre Company in Washington, D.C.  She recently portrayed Katherine in The Taming of the Shrew with the Company in D.C. Le Beauf also appeared in the off-Broadway play “LOVE, LOSS AND WHAT I WORE” that ran from 2009 to 2012.

Personal life
While performing at the Folger Theater in Washington, Le Beauf met businessman and producer Michael Reynolds in 1987. They married less than one month later, settling in New York. They remained married for over ten years but filed for divorce in 1997, which Le Beauf described as "a mutual decision."

Filmography

Awards and nominations
Young Artist Awards 1989: Best Young Actor/Actress Ensemble in a Television Comedy, Drama Series or Special The Cosby Show

References

External links

Actresses from Louisiana
1958 births
Living people
University of California, Los Angeles alumni
Yale School of Drama alumni
Louisiana Creole people
American interior designers
American voice actresses
People from Ama, Louisiana
People from Downey, California
American television actresses
African-American actresses
American stage actresses
American women interior designers
20th-century American actresses
21st-century American actresses
20th-century African-American women
20th-century African-American people
21st-century African-American women
21st-century African-American people